General elections were held in the Seychelles between 20 and 22 March 1998. Incumbent President France-Albert René and his Seychelles People's Progressive Front won both elections with over 60% of the vote, defeating a divided opposition.

Campaign
On the 4 February 1998 it was announced that the presidential and parliamentary elections would be held at the same time in March. President René and his ruling Seychelles People's Progressive Front were expected to easily win the elections. René enjoyed strong support for introducing a social welfare system and benefited from the inability of the opposition to unite against him. He was challenged by the former President James Mancham of the Seychelles Democratic Party, who he had deposed in a coup in 1977, and also by Wavel Ramkalawan of the new United Opposition party.

The election saw a joint team of international election monitors from the Commonwealth of Nations and Francophonie observe the election, the first time they had sent a combined team to observe an election. The team was led by Sir John Compton, former Prime Minister of Saint Lucia. The monitors said the election was mainly free and fair, and complemented it on being well organised. However, there were some complaints about vote buying by government officials.

Results

President
President René won the presidential election with two-thirds of the vote, while former President Mancham was beaten into third place by Wavel Ramkalawan.

Parliament
The parliamentary results saw the governing Seychelles People's Progressive Front win 24 of the 25 directly elected seats and a further 6 of the 9 seats that were elected proportionally. The opposition Democratic Party was reduced to only one seat, while the new United Opposition won three seats.

References

Elections in Seychelles
Seychelles
1998 in Seychelles
Presidential elections in Seychelles